Mamer railway station is a railway station serving Mamer, in south-western Luxembourg.  It is operated by Chemins de Fer Luxembourgeois, the state-owned railway company.

The station is situated on Line 50, which connects Luxembourg City to the west of the country and the Belgian town of Arlon. It is a station close to both the European School of Luxembourg II, but also Lycée Technique Josy Barthel. It is therefore busy with students in the mornings.

External links
 Official CFL page on Mamer station
 Rail.lu page on Mamer station

Railway stations in Mamer
Railway stations on CFL Line 50